The 1995 McNeese State Cowboys football team was an American football team that represented McNeese State University as a member of the Southland Conference (Southland) during the 1995 NCAA Division I-AA football season. In their sixth year under head coach Bobby Keasler, the team compiled an overall record of 13–1, with a mark of 5–0 in conference play, and finished as Southland champions. The Cowboys advanced to the Division I-AA playoffs and lost to Marshall in the semifinals.

Schedule

Roster

References

McNeese State
McNeese Cowboys football seasons
Southland Conference football champion seasons
McNeese State Cowboys football